Erginus Hihepaali Endjala, born at Ouhwaala in Omusati Region on  has been the Omusati Regional Governor since 2015.

Education 
Endjala graduated from the Simon Bolivar Technikon College Pinar de Rio Cuba with a Bachelor in statistics and from Intec College where he graduated with Advanced Diploma in Human Resources. He is pursuing his MBA at Robert Kennedy College, Zurich, Switzerland, in partnership with Cambria University, United Kingdom.

Career 
He worked as a senior quality controller at Lalandji Fishing, as well as a senior quality controller at Robben Sea Food in Western Cape South Africa. He was a fleet assistant manager at Coastal Marine in Lüderitz and also worked as head of personnel department and assistant department head of human resources, Pescanova Fishing. He served as a SWAPO Party Youth League (SPYL) district coordinator before becoming a district coordinator.

References 

1969 births

Living people
21st-century Namibian politicians
Governors of Omusati Region